Meusburger is a surname. Notable people with the surname include:

 Catherine Meusburger (born 1978), Austrian mathematician and physicist
 Josef Meusburger, Austrian para-alpine skier
 Stefan Meusburger (born 1993), Austrian footballer
 Yvonne Meusburger (born 1983), Austrian tennis player